Wanjikũ is a feminine Kikuyu name. Historically, Wanjikũ was one of the nine daughters of the man and wife who founded the Agĩkũyũ people, Gĩkũyũ and Mũmbi. Consequently, the descendants of her lineage form the Agacikũ Clan of the Agĩkũyũ tribe in Kenya.

People with the given name 
 Wanjiku Kabira (born 1948), professor of literature
 Wanjiku Mugane, attorney and investment banker
 Wanjiku Muhia, Kenyan politician
 Wanjiku the Teacher, Kenyan comedian, actress and producer
 Wanjiku wa Ngũgĩ (born 1970s), Kenyan writer

People with the surname 
 Beatrice Wanjiku, Kenyan artist
 Mercy Wanjiku (born 1986), Kenyan long-distance runner
 Teresa Wanjiku (born 1974), Kenyan long-distance runner

References 

Kenyan culture
Kenyan names